Cranborne Money is the common name given to the annual payment to opposition parties in the UK House of Lords to help them with their costs. It is named after Lord Cranborne, who was the leader of the House of Lords when it was introduced on 27 November 1996. Short Money is its counterpart in the House of Commons.

Annual allocations

In addition to the above funds, the salaries of the Leader of the Opposition and Opposition Chief Whip in the House of Lords ( the Labour Party) are also paid from public funds. In 2009/10 such payments amounted to £73,617 and £68,074 respectively.

References 

 

House of Lords
1996 introductions
Political funding in the United Kingdom
1996 establishments in England
Public finance of the United Kingdom